Chathurangapara  is a village in Idukki district in the Indian state of Kerala. The village is part of Udumbanchola (ward nos 4,7,11)  and Senapathy Panchayats (ward 6,7).

Demographics
As of 2011 Census, Chathurangapara had a total population of 4,177 which constitutes 2,124 males and 2,053 females. The average sex ratio was 967 oower than the state average of 1084.

In Chathurangapara, 7.5% of the population was under 6 years of age. Chathurangapara had an average literacy of 81.5% lower than the state average of 94%; male literacy was 86.6% and female literacy was 76.3%.

Image Gallery

References

Villages in Idukki district